Peter Alexander Van Herrewege, (born December 1953) is a businessman.

He is chairman of Prime Life Limited which was established more than 30 years ago. The company runs Peaker Park Care Village, built in 2011, an £11 million residential complex for the elderly and disabled, on the edge of Market Harborough. It also runs a residential home in Skegness  and 63 other properties. It has 1,700 clients and 1,500 staff. He is planning to build a 35-bedroom care home and social centre in Scunthorpe.

References

British businesspeople
Nursing homes in the United Kingdom
Social care in England
1953 births
Living people